Sarah Weeks (born March 18, 1955) is an American  writer of children's books, perhaps best known for the novel So B. It which has won several juvenile literature awards. In 2007 it won the Rebecca Caudill Young Reader's Book Award and William Allen White Children's Book Award.

Biography
Sarah Weeks was born in Ann Arbor, Michigan, in 1955, the daughter of an English professor. She has a brother and a sister. When she was a little girl, the things she liked to do best were playing music and writing. When she grew up, she went to New York City, married, and had two sons, Gabriel and Nathaniel.

Selected works

Chapter books

Oggie Cooder series
 Oggie Cooder
 Oggie Cooder, Party Animal

Guy series
 Regular Guy (Laura Geringer/HarperCollins, 1999) 
 Guy Time
 My Guy

Boyds Will Be Boyds series
 Beware of Mad Dog
 Get Well Soon or Else!
 Danger! Boys Dancing!
 Fink's Funk!

Other
Tripping Over the Lunch Lady and Other School Stories
The Little Factory

Picture books
 Hurricane City (HarperCollins, 1993), illustrated by James Warhola

Novels
As Simple as it Seems
So B. It
Jumping the Scratch
Up All Night
PIE
Honey
Save Me a Seat
Soof

References

External links
 
 
 

1955 births
American children's writers
American women novelists
21st-century American novelists
Living people
American women children's writers
21st-century American women writers
Writers from Ann Arbor, Michigan